William Clarence Eckstine (July 8, 1914 – March 8, 1993) was an American jazz and pop singer and a bandleader during the swing and bebop eras. He was noted for his rich, almost operatic bass-baritone voice. In 2019, Eckstine was posthumously awarded the Grammy Lifetime Achievement Award "for performers who, during their lifetimes, have made creative contributions of outstanding artistic significance to the field of recording." His recording of "I Apologize" (MGM, 1948) was given the Grammy Hall of Fame Award in 1999. The New York Times described him as an "influential band leader" whose "suave bass-baritone" and "full-throated, sugary approach to popular songs inspired singers like Earl Coleman, Johnny Hartman, Joe Williams, Arthur Prysock, and Lou Rawls."

Early life and education

Eckstine was born in Pittsburgh, Pennsylvania, United States, the son of William Eckstein, a chauffeur, and Charlotte Eckstein, a seamstress. Eckstine's paternal grandparents were William F. Eckstein and Nannie Eckstein, a mixed-race, married couple who lived in Washington, D.C.; both were born in 1863. William was born in Prussia (Germany), and Nannie in Virginia. Billy's sister, Maxine, was a high school teacher.

Eckstine attended Peabody High School in Pittsburgh.  Other notables who attended there include the artist Romare Bearden, Gene Kelly, pianist Dodo Marmarosa and Lorin Maazel. After high school, he moved to Washington, D.C. where he attended Armstrong High School, St. Paul Normal and Industrial School, and Howard University. He left Howard in 1933 after winning first place in an amateur talent contest, imitating Cab Calloway singing a nursery rhyme and scatting.

Career
Heading to Chicago, Illinois, Eckstine joined Earl Hines' Grand Terrace Orchestra in 1939, staying with the band as vocalist and trumpeter until 1943. By that time, Eckstine had begun to make a name for himself through the Hines band's juke-box hits, such as "Stormy Monday Blues", and his own "Jelly, Jelly".

In 1944, Eckstine formed his own big band, and it became the finishing school for adventurous young musicians who would shape the future of jazz including Charlie Parker, Dizzy Gillespie, Dexter Gordon, Gene Ammons, Miles Davis, Art Blakey, Ceceil Payne, Fats Navarro, Lucky Thompson, John Malachi, Sarah Vaughan, Pearl Bailey, and Lena Horne. Tadd Dameron, Gil Fuller and Jerry Valentine were among the band's arrangers. The Billy Eckstine Orchestra is considered to be the first bebop big-band, and had Top Ten chart entries that included "A Cottage for Sale" and "Prisoner of Love". Both were awarded a gold disc by the RIAA.

Dizzy Gillespie, in reflecting on the band in his 1979 autobiography To Be or Not to Bop, gives this perspective: "There was no band that sounded like Billy Eckstine's. Our attack was strong, and we were playing bebop, the modern style. No other band like this one existed in the world." In 1946 Eckstine starred as the hero in the musical film Rhythm in a Riff, which also starred Ann Baker and Lucky Millinder.

Eckstine became a solo performer in 1947, with records featuring lush, sophisticated orchestrations. Even before folding his band, Eckstine had recorded solo to support it, scoring two million-sellers in 1945 with "Cottage for Sale" and a revival of "Prisoner of Love". Far more successful than his band recordings, these prefigured Eckstine's future career. Eckstine would go on to record over a dozen hits during the late 1940s. He signed with the newly established MGM Records, and had immediate hits with revivals of "Everything I Have Is Yours" (1947), Rodgers and Hart's "Blue Moon" (1948), and Juan Tizol's "Caravan" (1949).

Eckstine had further success in 1950 with Victor Young's theme song to "My Foolish Heart," and the next year with a revival of the 1931 Bing Crosby hit, "I Apologize".

His 1950 appearance at the Paramount Theatre in New York City, drew a larger audience than Frank Sinatra at his Paramount performance.

Eckstine was the subject of a three-page profile in the April 25, 1950 issue of Life magazine, in which the photographer Martha Holmes accompanied Eckstine and his entourage during a week in New York City. One photograph taken by Holmes and published in Life showed Eckstine with a group of white female admirers, one of whom had her hand on his shoulder and her head on his chest while she was laughing. Eckstine's biographer, Cary Ginell, wrote of the image that Holmes "...captured a moment of shared exuberance, joy, and affection, unblemished by racial tension". Holmes would later describe the photograph as the favorite of the many she had taken in her career as it "...told just what the world should be like". The photograph was considered so controversial that an editor at Life sought personal approval from Henry Luce, the magazine's publisher, who said it should be published. The publication of the image caused letters of protest to be written to the magazine, and singer Harry Belafonte subsequently said of the publication that "When that photo hit, in this national publication, it was if a barrier had been broken". The controversy that resulted from the photograph had a seminal effect on the trajectory of Eckstine's career. Tony Bennett would recall that "It changed everything...Before that, he had a tremendous following...and it just offended the white community", a sentiment shared by pianist Billy Taylor who said that the "coverage and that picture just slammed the door shut for him".

In 1951, Eckstine performed at the seventh Cavalcade of Jazz concert held on July 8 at Wrigley Field in Los Angeles, produced by Leon Hefflin, Sr. Also featured were Lionel Hampton and his Revue, Percy Mayfield, Jimmy Witherspoon, Joe Liggins and The Honeydrippers and Roy Brown.

Among Eckstine's recordings of the 1950s was a 1957 duet with Sarah Vaughan, "Passing Strangers", a minor hit for them in 1957, but an initial No. 22 success in the UK Singles Chart.

The 1960 Las Vegas live album, No Cover, No Minimum, featured Eckstine taking a few trumpet solos and showcasing his nightclub act. He recorded albums for Mercury and Roulette in the early 1960s and appeared on Motown albums during the mid to late years of the decade. After recording sparingly during the 1970s for Al Bell's Stax/Enterprise imprint, the international touring Eckstine made his last recording, the Grammy-nominated Billy Eckstine Sings with Benny Carter in 1986.

Eckstine made numerous appearances on television variety shows, including on The Ed Sullivan Show, The Nat King Cole Show, The Tonight Show with Steve Allen, Jack Paar, and Johnny Carson, The Merv Griffin Show, The Art Linkletter Show, The Joey Bishop Show, The Dean Martin Show, The Flip Wilson Show, and Playboy After Dark. He also performed as an actor in the TV sitcom Sanford and Son, and in such films as Skirts Ahoy, Let's Do It Again, and Jo Jo Dancer. He performed "The Star-Spangled Banner" prior to Game 4 of the 1979 World Series at Three Rivers Stadium in his native Pittsburgh.

Culturally Eckstine was a fashion icon. He was famous for his "Mr. B. Collar" – a high roll collar that formed a "B" over a Windsor-knotted tie (or without a tie at all). The collars were worn by many a hipster in the late 1940s and early 1950s.

In 1984, Eckstine recorded his penultimate album, I Am a Singer, arranged and conducted by Angelo DiPippo and featuring Toots Thielemans on harmonica. In November 1986, Eckstine recorded with saxophonist Benny Carter for his 1987 album Billy Eckstine Sings with Benny Carter. Eckstine made his final recordings for Motorcity Records, a label for ex-Motown artists founded by Ian Levine.

Personal life
He married his first wife June in 1942.  After their divorce in 1952, he married actress and model Carolle Drake in 1953, and they remained married until his death. He was the father of four children by his second marriage including Ed Eckstine, a president of Mercury Records; Guy Eckstine, a Columbia and Verve Records A&R executive and record producer; international singer Charlotte Eckstine; and singer Gina Eckstine.

Illness and death
Eckstine suffered a stroke while performing in Salina, Kansas, in April 1992, and never performed again. Though his speech improved in the hospital, Eckstine had a heart attack and died a few months later on March 8, 1993, in Pittsburgh, aged 78. His final word was "Basie".

A State Historical Marker was placed at 5913 Bryant Street in Pittsburgh's Highland Park neighborhood to mark the house where Eckstine grew up.

Tributes
His friend Duke Ellington recalled Eckstine's artistry in his 1973 autobiography Music is My Mistress: 
Eckstine-style love songs opened new lines of communication for the man in the man-woman merry-go-round, and blues a la B were the essence of cool. When he made a recording of "Caravan", I was happy and honored to watch one of our tunes help take him into the stratosphere of universal acclaim. And, of course, he hasn't looked back since. A remarkable artist, the sonorous B. ... His style and technique have been extensively copied by some of the neocommercial singers, but despite their efforts, he remains out front to show how and what should have been done.

Sammy Davis, Jr. made several live appearances and impersonated Eckstine. Eckstine was a pallbearer at Davis' funeral in 1990.

And, in Billboard, Quincy Jones stated:
I looked up to Mr. B as an idol. I wanted to dress like him, talk like him, pattern my whole life as a musician and as a complete person in the image of dignity that he projected.... As a black man, Eckstine was not immune to the prejudice that characterized the 1950s.

Jones is quoted in The Pleasures of Jazz as also saying of Eckstine: 
If he'd been white, the sky would have been the limit. As it was, he didn't have his own radio or TV show, much less a movie career. He had to fight the system, so things never quite fell into place."

Lionel Hampton said: 
He was one of the greatest singers of all time.... We were proud of him because he was the first Black popular singer singing popular songs in our race. We, the whole music profession, were so happy to see him achieve what he was doing. He was one of the greatest singers of that era... He was our singer."

Discography

10" LP releases
 1940: Earl Hines – Billy Eckstine [Record 1: Stormy Monday Blues // Water Boy; Record 2: I Got It Bad (And That Ain't Good) // Somehow; Record 3: Jelly, Jelly // Skylark] (RCA Victor) 3x78rpm album set
 1949 Billy Eckstine Sings (National) - recorded 1945–1947
 1950 Songs By Billy Eckstine (MGM)
 1951 Billy Eckstine Favorites (MGM)
 1952 Love Songs By Rodgers and Hammerstein (MGM)
 1953 Billy Eckstine Sings Tenderly (MGM)
 1953 Earl Hines – Billy Eckstine: A Treasury Of Immortal Performances (RCA Victor) - recorded 1940–1942
 1953 The Great Mr. B: Billy Eckstine and His All-Star Band (DeLuxe/King) - recorded 1944
 1954 I Let a Song Go Out of My Heart: Billy Eckstine Sings 8 Great Duke Ellington Songs (MGM)
 1954 Blues For Sale (EmArcy)
 1954 The Love Songs of Mr. B (EmArcy)

12" LP releases
 1955 I Surrender, Dear (EmArcy)
 1955 Mr. B With a Beat (MGM) - with George Shearing Quintet, Woody Herman Orchestra, and The Metronome All Stars.
 1955 Rendezvous (MGM)
 1955 That Old Feeling (MGM)
 1957 Prisoner of Love (Regent)
 1957 The Duke, The Blues and Me! (Regent)
 1957 My Deep Blue Dream (Regent)
 1958 You Call It Madness (Regent)
 1958 Billy Eckstine's Imagination (EmArcy)
 1958 Billy Eckstine & Sarah Vaughan Sing Irving Berlin (Mercury)
 1958 Billy's Best! (Mercury)
 1959 Basie and Eckstine, Inc. with Count Basie Orchestra (Roulette)
 1960 No Cover, No Minimum (Roulette)
 1960 Once More With Feeling (Roulette)
 1961 Mr. B In Paris (Felsted/Decca [UK]; Barclay [France]) rec. 1957–1958; all 12 songs sung in French
 1961 Broadway, Bongos and Mr. B (Mercury)
 1962 At Basin St. East with Quincy Jones (Mercury)
 1962 Don't Worry 'Bout Me (Mercury)
 1963 The Golden Hits of Billy Eckstine (Mercury) - compilation
 1963 Now Singing In 12 Great Movies (Mercury)
 1964 The Modern Sound of Mr. B (Mercury)
 1965 The Prime of My Life (Motown)
 1966 My Way (Motown)
 1969 For Love of Ivy [also released as Gentle On My Mind] (Motown)
 1971 Stormy (Enterprise/Stax)
 1971 Feel the Warm (Enterprise/Stax)
 1971 Moment (Capitol)
 1972 Senior Soul (Enterprise/Stax)
 1974 If She Walked Into My Life (Enterprise/Stax)
 1979 Momento Brasiliero (Portuguese import release on Som Livre label)
 1984 I Am a Singer (Kimbo)
 1986 Billy Eckstine Sings with Benny Carter with special guest: Helen Merrill (Verve)

LP/CD compilations of note
 1960 Mr. B: The Great Billy Eckstine and His Orchestra (Audio Lab) - 12" LP reissue of The Great Mr. B from DeLuxe/King. 
 1963 Billy & Sarah with Sarah Vaughan (Lion) - compilation
 1971 Billy Eckstine Together (Spotlite) - 1945 live "radio broadcast" recordings
 1979 Billy Eckstine Sings (Savoy Jazz) - compilation
 1986 Mister B. and the Band: The Savoy Sessions (Savoy Jazz) - compilation
 1986 I Want To Talk About You (Xanadu) - this compilation features Eckstine's earliest recordings, 13 selections taken from his 1940–1942 Bluebird sides with the Earl Hines Orchestra; album is rounded out by 3 ballads taken from a 1945 live "radio broadcast" with his own big band.
 1991 Everything I Have Is Yours: The Best Of The MGM Years (Verve) - 2CD anthology with 42 tracks (note: the original 2-LP set was issued in 1985 with just 30 tracks)
 1991 Compact Jazz: Billy Eckstine (Verve) - compilation
 1994 Jazz 'Round Midnight: Billy Eckstine (Verve) - compilation
 1994 Verve Jazz Masters (Volume 22): Billy Eckstine (Verve) - compilation
 1996 Air Mail Special (Drive Archive) - reissue of the 1945 live "radio broadcast" recordings.
 1996 The Magnificent Mr. B (Flapper/Pearl) - anthology/compilation of material recorded with Earl Hines (for the Bluebird label), and Eckstine's recordings with his orchestra (for the DeLuxe and National labels).
 1997 The Chronological Billy Eckstine and His Orchestra 1944–1945 (Classics) - anthology/compilation
 1999 The Chronological Billy Eckstine and His Orchestra 1946–1947 (Classics) - anthology/compilation
 2001 Mr. B (ASV/Living Era) - anthology/compilation
 2002 Timeless Billy Eckstine (Savoy Jazz) - compilation
 2002 The Legendary Big Band 1943–1947 (Savoy Jazz) - 2CD anthology (all of Eckstine's recordings for the DeLuxe and National labels).
 2003 Kiss of Fire (Sepia) - compilation (contains 25 tracks recorded 1947–1952 for the MGM label).
 2003 The Motown Years (Motown/UMe) - 2CD anthology
 2004 Love Songs (Savoy Jazz) - compilation
 2004 A Proper Introduction To Billy Eckstine: Ballads, Blues and Bebop (Proper) - anthology/compilation
 2005 Jukebox Hits 1943–1953 (Acrobat) - anthology/compilation
 2005 Early Mr. B: 1940–1953 (Jazz Legends) - anthology/compilation of material recorded with Earl Hines (for the Bluebird label), and Eckstine's recordings with his orchestra (for the DeLuxe, National and MGM labels).
 2006 Prisoner of Love: The Romantic Billy Eckstine (Savoy Jazz) - this is a reissue of Timeless Billy Eckstine.
 2008 All of My Life (Jasmine) - 2CD anthology (contains 35 tracks recorded for the MGM label; also includes all 10 of his 1956 RCA recordings; and 10 of his 1957–1958 Mercury recordings).

References

External links

 
 
 

1914 births
1993 deaths
20th-century American singers
Activists for African-American civil rights
20th-century African-American male singers
American crooners
American jazz bandleaders
American jazz singers
American jazz trombonists
Male trombonists
American jazz trumpeters
American male trumpeters
Big band bandleaders
MGM Records artists
Motown artists
Musicians from Pittsburgh
Mercury Records artists
RCA Victor artists
Singers from Pennsylvania
Traditional pop music singers
American bass-baritones
20th-century American guitarists
20th-century trumpeters
20th-century trombonists
Guitarists from Pennsylvania
American male guitarists
Jazz musicians from Pennsylvania
20th-century American male singers
American male jazz musicians
Grammy Lifetime Achievement Award winners
American people of Prussian descent